The Banting Lectures  are a yearly series of research presentations given by an expert in diabetes. The name of the lecture series refers to Canadian physician Sir Frederick Banting, who was a seminal scientist, doctor and Nobel laureate for the co-discovery of insulin. The lectures are currently hosted by the American Diabetes Association.

List of past Banting lectures
 2009: From the Triumvirate to the Ominous Octet: A New Paradigm for the Treatment of Type 2 Diabetes Mellitus.  Ralph A DeFronzo
 2006a: Cure, Optimal Care and Total Commitment: What if they happened tomorrow? Pizza, Robert 
 2006b: Harmony and Discord in the Orchestration of Glucose Metabolism. Bergman, Richard 
 2005: Critical conversations: fat, brain, and the regulation of energy balance. Flier JS
 2004. The pathobiology of diabetic complications. A unifying mechanism. Brownlee M,  
 2003. Autoimmune diabetes and the circle of tolerance. Rossini AA, 

...

 2001: Dysregulation of fatty acid metabolism in the etiology of type 2 diabetes. McGarry JD, 

...

 1997: Control of glucose uptake and release by the liver in vivo. Cherrington AD, 

...

 1995: A lesson in metabolic regulation inspired by the glucokinase glucose sensor paradigm.
Matschinsky FM,  
 1994?: Hypoglycemia: the limiting factor in the management of IDDM. Cryer PE,  

...

 1991; Type 2 (non-insulin-dependent) diabetes mellitus: the thrifty phenotype hypothesis, Hales CN 
 1990; Beta-cells in Type II diabetes, Porte D, Jr. 
 1989: Structure and function of insulin receptors, Rosen OM,  
 1988: Role of insulin resistance in human disease. Reaven GM,  and  

...

 1981: Macro- and micro-domains in the endocrine pancreas, Orci L 

...
 1965: Some Current Controversies in Diabetes Research. Berson, SA and Yalow, RS. PMID:5318828

External links
Diabetes Library
Banting's Nobel lecture
Google search of Diabetes journal for Banting lecture
less specific global Google search for "Banting lecture"

Lecture series
Diabetes
Annual events in the United States